The following lists events that happened during 1915 in Chile.

Incumbents
President of Chile: Ramón Barros Luco (until 23 December), Juan Luis Sanfuentes

Events 
14 March – Chilean parliamentary election, 1915
14 March – Battle of Más a Tierra
25 June- Chilean presidential election, 1915

Births
date unknown – Mireya Véliz (d. 2013)
10 January – Higinio Ortúzar (d. 1982)
24 February – Carlos Prats (d. 1974)
19 November – Anita Lizana (d. 1994)
25 November – Augusto Pinochet (d. 2006)
14 December – José Toribio Merino (d. 1996)

Deaths 
2 April – Luis Joaquín Morales

References 

 
Years of the 20th century in Chile
Chile